Theta is General Motors' automobile platform for compact/mid-size crossover SUVs. The architecture debuted in 2002 with the Saturn Vue and was later used for the Chevrolet Equinox and Captiva and similar models.

Development
The Theta uses a four-wheel independent suspension. Engine choices include the Family II straight-4, Ecotec straight-4, 3400 V6, and even a Honda V6, the L66. A 5-speed automatic and two 5-speed manual transmissions are used.

The original Saturn Vue used a short 106.6 in (2708 mm) wheelbase, with a 61 in (1549 mm) track. The Chevrolet Equinox and Pontiac Torrent use a stretched 112.5 in (2857 mm) wheelbase, but share much with the Saturn.

The Suzuki Grand Vitara, although similar in size and appearance to a Saturn Vue, was developed by Suzuki using some Theta components, but should not be considered a Theta derivative.  The Grand Vitara front and rear suspensions are substantially different from the Theta vehicles. The 2007 Suzuki XL7 is based on the Theta platform and is built alongside the Equinox and Torrent at CAMI Automotive in Ingersoll, Ontario, Canada. It is the first non-GM branded vehicle to come off the Theta platform.  Styled by Suzuki, the engineering was performed by GM engineers in the US and Canada.

Engineering for the Opel Antara, and Chevrolet Captiva was performed in large part in Korea by GM Daewoo Auto & Technology, and by Opel in Germany as well.

Hybrids
The Saturn Vue was one of the first of General Motors' vehicles to be offered with a hybrid powertrain, GM's belt alternator starter (BAS) system, in 2006.

Vehicles
 Short wheelbase
 2002-2007 Saturn Vue
 2006–2015 Opel Antara 
 2006-2011 Daewoo Winstorm MaXX*
 2006–2017 Chevrolet Captiva Sport*
 2008-2010 Saturn Vue*
 2008-2010 GMC Terrain sold in Middle East*
 2006-2008 Holden Captiva Maxx*
 2009–2017 Holden Captiva 5*
 2006–present Chevrolet Captiva
 2006-2011 Daewoo Winstorm**
 2006–2017 Holden Captiva 7**

Note: Vehicles with "*" are rebadged versions of the Opel Antara
Note: Vehicles with "**" are rebadged versions of the Chevrolet Captiva

 Long wheelbase
 2005-2009 Chevrolet Equinox
 2006-2009 Pontiac Torrent
 2006-2009 Suzuki XL7
 2010–2017 Chevrolet Equinox
 2010–2017 GMC Terrain

Concepts
 Chevrolet S3X/T2X

Theta Premium

General Motors has created a premium version of Theta for luxury applications. Reports differ, but the consensus is that it is a combination of the current Theta and elements of the new Epsilon 2 architecture. Thus this platform is sometimes also referred to as Theta-Epsilon (GMT166).  Theta Premium supports larger models than the standard platform.

Vehicles using Theta Premium:
 2010-2016 Cadillac SRX
 2011 Saab 9-4X

References

Theta